Maulik is a popular Indian and Bangladeshi name. Also seen as Moulik, Maulick and Moulick.

Notable people with the name include:

As surname:
Samarendra Maulik (1881–1950), Indian entomologist 
Ujjwal Maulik, Indian computer scientist
Asim Maulik, West Bengali football player
As given name:
Maulik Pancholy (born 1974), American actor

See also
Malik (disambiguation)
Mulaik, a surname

Indian masculine given names